|}

The Belgrave Stakes is a Listed flat horse race in Ireland open to horses aged three years or older.
It is run at the Curragh over a distance of 6 furlongs (1,206 metres), and it is scheduled to take place each year in June. 

The race was first run in 1991. It took place at Leopardstown until 1997 and at Fairyhouse from 1998 to 2000 and from 2006 to 2014.

Winners

See also
 Horse racing in Ireland
 List of Irish flat horse races

References
Racing Post:
, 

Flat races in Ireland
Open sprint category horse races
Curragh Racecourse
Recurring sporting events established in 1991
1991 establishments in Ireland